Ceracia dentata is a species of bristle fly in the family Tachinidae.

Distribution
It is found in Canada, the United States, Mexico, and Chile.

References

Exoristinae
Diptera of North America
Diptera of South America
Taxa named by Daniel William Coquillett
Insects described in 1895